Dentelbach may refer to:

Dentelbach (Steinach), a river of Baden-Württemberg, Germany, tributary of the Steinach
Dentelbach (Murr), a river of Baden-Württemberg, Germany, tributary of the Murr